Sventevith can refer to:

 Svetovid, a god in Slavic mythology
 Sventevith (Storming Near the Baltic), an album recorded by Behemoth